Pleasant Hill is an unincorporated community in Scott County, Arkansas, United States.

References

Unincorporated communities in Scott County, Arkansas
Unincorporated communities in Arkansas